Walwa may refer to:

Walwa, Victoria, Australia
Walwa, Sangli, Maharashtra, India